Brazieria obesa is a species of air-breathing land snails, terrestrial pulmonate gastropod mollusks in the family Zonitidae, the true glass snails. This species is endemic to Micronesia. It was listed as Vulnerable in 1994 until changing to Data Deficient in 1996.

References

Fauna of Micronesia
obesa
Taxonomy articles created by Polbot